Drechslera campanulata is a plant pathogen.

References

External links
 USDA ARS Fungal Database

Pleosporaceae
Fungal plant pathogens and diseases
Taxa named by Joseph-Henri Léveillé
Fungi described in 1841